Kjerulf Glacier, is a glacier  long flowing west from Mount Sugartop to the east side of Newark Bay, on the south coast of South Georgia. It was mapped by Olaf Holtedahl during his visit to South Georgia in 1927–28, and named by him for Norwegian geologist Theodor Kjerulf, Professor of Mineralogy at the University of Christiania.

See also
 List of glaciers in the Antarctic
 Glaciology

References

Glaciers of South Georgia